Martina Koch (born 28 August 1965 in Graz) is a German professional golfer. She won the European Ladies Amateur Championship twice and the Austrian Ladies Open on the Ladies European Tour.

Career
Koch's father was a golf coach and started teaching her at age 7. In 1981 she finished 4th at the German Amateur Championship and in 1982 she was German Junior Champion.

Koch represented her National Team in the Espirito Santo Trophy five times between 1984 and 1994. She arrived at the University of Arizona as the reigning European women's amateur champion, having won the inaugural title in 1986 and again in 1990. As a freshman she was ranked in the top five nationally and was named All-Pac-10 and All-American. She went on to become an All-American selection four years running, the first four time All-American in University of Arizona women's golf history. At the Pac-10 championships she finished 13th in 1988, third in 1989 and runner-up in 1990. She received the 1990 Pac-10 medal as University of Arizona's outstanding female student athlete. She later received a master's degree in golf course architecture from Kansas State University.

In 1996, Koch won her maiden title on the Ladies European Tour, the Austrian Ladies Open, by two strokes over New Zealander Lynnette Brooky. She was only the second German winner on the LET, after Barbara Helbig in 1983. Koch finished 1996 in 25th place on the Order of Merit.

Amateur wins
1986 European Ladies Amateur Championship
1990 European Ladies Amateur Championship

Professional wins

Ladies European Tour wins (1)

Other wins
1984 German National Open Championship
1986 German National Open Championship
1994 German National Open Championship
1997 German National Open Championship

Source:

Team appearances
Amateur
Vagliano Trophy: (representing the Continent of Europe): 1983, 1985
Espirito Santo Trophy (representing West Germany): 1984, 1986, 1988
European Ladies' Team Championship (representing West Germany): 1983, 1985, 1989
Espirito Santo Trophy (representing Germany): 1990, 1994
Source:

References

External links

German female golfers
Arizona Wildcats women's golfers
Ladies European Tour golfers
Sportspeople from Graz
1965 births
Living people
20th-century German women